Konstantin Aleksandrovich Gorovenko (born 10 January 1977) is a Kazakh former international football player and former manager of FC Atyrau.

Career

Managerial
On 18 June 2020, Gorovenko was appointed as manager of Shakhter Karagandy.

On 5 January 2021, FC Zhetysu announced the appointment of Gorovenko as their new manager.

Career statistics

International

Statistics accurate as of match played 25 April 2001

International goals
Scores and results list Kazakhstan's goal tally first.

References

External links

1977 births
Living people
Kazakhstani footballers
Kazakhstan international footballers
Association football defenders
FC Megasport players
FC Kairat players
FC Zhetysu players
FC Zhenis Astana players
FC Sunkar players
Kazakhstan Premier League players
FC Shakhter Karagandy managers
FC Zhetysu managers
FC Atyrau managers
Kazakhstan Premier League managers